San Juan Evangelista is a municipality located in the plains of the Sotavento zone in the central zone of the State of Veracruz, about 260 km from state capital Xalapa. It has a surface of 968.94 km2.

Geographic limits

The municipality of  San Juan Evangelista  is delimited to the north by Acayucan, to the east by Sayula de Alemán, to the south-east by Jesús Carranza, to the south by Oaxaca State and to the west by Juan Rodríguez Clara. There is watered by the river San Juan, which is a tributary of the Papaloapan.

Agriculture

It produces principally maize, beans, coffee, rice, orange fruit and green chile.

Celebrations

In  San Juan Evangelista, in December takes place the celebration in honor to San Juan Evangelista, Patron of the town, and takes place the celebration in honor to Virgen de Guadalupe.

Weather

The weather in San Juan Evangelista is very warm and wet all year with rains in summer and autumn.

History
Mariano Rodríguez Pérez, commander of the municipal police department, was assassinated in February 2019.

References

External links 

  Municipal Official webpage
  Municipal Official Information

Municipalities of Veracruz